F&R Lazarus & Company – commonly known as Lazarus – was a regional department store with its retail chain operating primarily in the U.S. Midwest, and based in Columbus, Ohio. For over 150 years, Lazarus was influential in the American retail industry, particularly during the early 20th century as a founding partner in Federated Department Stores, and continued until the nameplate was retired on March 6, 2005, in favor of Macy's.

History

Beginnings 

Family patriarch Simon Lazarus (1808–1877) opened a one-room men's clothing store in downtown Columbus in 1851. By 1870, with improvements to the industry in the mass manufacture of men's uniforms for the Civil War, the family business expanded to include ready-made men's civilian clothing, and eventually, a complete line of merchandise.

Sons Fred Lazarus Sr. (1850–1917) and Ralph Lazarus (1852–1903) joined the business and added many innovative marketing techniques. The company acquired the John Shillito Company of Cincinnati in 1928 (established in 1830), and a year later, was one of the four founding members of Federated Department Stores (along with Williams Filene's Sons Co. and Abraham & Straus). Bloomingdale Brothers joined the company in 1930.

Lazarus developed or was an early adopter of many shopping innovations such as "one low price" (no bargaining necessary, earlier implemented by the John Wanamaker Store), first department store escalators in the country, first air-conditioned store in the country, and Fred Lazarus Jr. successfully lobbied President Franklin Roosevelt to permanently fix Thanksgiving as the fourth Thursday in November, ensuring a stable timetable for the official beginning of the Christmas shopping season.

Those who worked at Lazarus were not called employees, but associates.

Fred Lazarus Jr. (1884–1973) 

Fred Lazarus Jr. served as president of Federated Department Stores, Inc. from its founding until 1947, and thereafter, served as board chairman until his death. He was succeeded by his son Ralph Lazarus (1914–1988), who led Federated through the 1980s. Various Lazarus family members also held key positions on Federated's board and within its various divisions, namely, Foley's, Filene's, Lazarus and Shillito's. Robert Lazarus Jr. (1927–2013) was the last family member with an official role at Federated, serving as assistant to Ron Klein in 2002, then chairman and CEO of the Rich's/Lazarus/Goldsmith's operating unit of Federated, now a portion of Macy's.

Expansion 

Primarily operating in central Ohio, Lazarus dominated its market, driving the last of its traditional rivals out of business by 1982. Eventually expanding into Indianapolis, Indiana, in 1973 and Huntington, West Virginia, in 1981; in 1986 Lazarus merged with fellow Federated division Shillito–Rike's, itself the result of 1982 merger between Shillito's (John Shillito Co.) and Dayton, Ohio-based Rike's, acquired by Federated in 1959. The new division adopted the Lazarus nameplate, while assuming Shillito–Rike's headquarters in Cincinnati.

In 1987, Federated acquired William H. Block Company of Indianapolis, Indiana (including Wren's, Springfield, Ohio) and Herpolsheimer's of Grand Rapids, Michigan from Allied Stores and incorporated them into Lazarus. In 1989, Lazarus' sprawling downtown Columbus flagship store became one of the three anchors of Columbus City Center mall, when developer Taubman Centers constructed a pedestrian skywalk to it over South High Street.

Federated experimented with several different formats in the Lazarus division. In 1967, Federated opened its Gold Circle discount department store division in Columbus, locating stores directly across from Lazarus stores at Northland, Eastland and Westland malls. In the mid-1970s Federated opened its "Capri" shops, off-mall Lazarus stores that budget store goods. Lazarus eventually opened three "Capri" shops, but they were later converted to limited-assortment Lazarus stores. Lazarus was the only Federated division to open full-line stores in tertiary markets such as Lima, Ohio; Huntington, West Virginia and Mansfield, Ohio. Federated also experimented with "Home Works at Lazarus" which was somewhat similar to today's HomeGoods or Bed Bath & Beyond stores. Finally, in the mid-1980s Lazarus experimented with small-market stores in Owensboro, Kentucky; and Lancaster, Newark and Zanesville, Ohio, all of which have since closed.

Merger with Horne's 
In 1994, Joseph Horne Co., Pittsburgh, Pennsylvania, was acquired by Federated and its 10 locations absorbed by Lazarus. Lazarus moved into the  Horne's building for one year before building a new more modern location,

Merge with Rich's 
Having absorbed several department stores itself over the years, in 1995 the chain was integrated into an Atlanta, Georgia-based division of Federated along with that city's Rich's and Memphis, Tennessee's Goldsmith's, while retaining its name in local markets.

Merge with Macy's 
The so-called RLG division was among Federated's five smaller nameplates absorbed into the Macy's brand, along with Miami, Florida's Burdines and Seattle, Washington's The Bon Marché. The Lazarus stores were eventually co-branded with Macy's in 2003, becoming Lazarus-Macy's prior to the 2005 name change.

The converted former Lazarus stores initially were part of the Macy's South division. In early 2007, after systems integrations were complete, the stores comprising the former Lazarus franchise in Ohio, Indiana, West Virginia, Western Pennsylvania, and Kentucky were transferred to the Macy's Midwest division, based in St. Louis, Missouri. By February 2008, Macy's Midwest was merged with Atlanta-based Macy's South to form a newly constituted Macy's Central division.

References 

Retail companies established in 1851
Defunct department stores based in Columbus, Ohio
Macy's
Clothing retailers of the United States
Companies based in the Columbus, Ohio metropolitan area
Companies that filed for Chapter 11 bankruptcy in 1990
Retail companies disestablished in 2005
Defunct companies based in Columbus, Ohio
1851 establishments in Ohio